Wrixon is a surname. Notable people with the surname include: 

Eric Wrixon (1947–2015), Northern Ireland musician
Henry Wrixon (1839–1913), Australian barrister and politician
Margaret White Wrixon (born 1944), British swimmer
Maris Wrixon (1916–1999), American actress

See also
Rixon